Tetrapora may refer to:
 Tetrapora (plant), a genus of flowering plants in the family Myrtaceae
 Tetrapora (bryozoan), a fossil genus of bryozoa in the family Cytididae
 Tetrapora, a genus of cnidarians in the family Tetraporellidae; synonym of Hayasakaia